"An Apple Red as Blood" is the 21st episode of the American fairy tale/drama television series Once Upon a Time, which aired in the United States on ABC on May 6, 2012.

The series takes place in the fictional seaside town of Storybrooke, Maine, in which the residents are actually characters from various fairy tales that were transported to the "real world" town by a powerful curse. In this outing, Henry attempts to convince Emma Swan to remain in Storybrooke and Regina Mills devises a master plan with Jefferson that will force Emma into leaving forever while the events surrounding Snow White's attempted rescue of Prince Charming are revealed along with her plan to enlist the aid of her allies and defeat the Evil Queen once and for all.

It was co-written by Jane Espenson and David H. Goodman, while Milan Cheylov served as director.

Plot

In the characters' past
King George decides that Prince Charming will be beheaded, but The Evil Queen makes a deal trading Charming for all the riches he would have been paid if he had married Midas’ daughter.

The Queen gives Snow White an apple and makes a deal with her that if she eats the apple, she will be entombed in her own body, but Charming will live. Snow White eats the apple and Charming feels her soul in his cell.

In Storybrooke
Regina sees that her apple tree is dying and goes to Mr. Gold, who tells her the curse could be weakening. Regina tries to strike a deal with Mr. Gold, but he turns down the offer. She uses Jefferson's hat to open a portal and retrieve an apple. Jefferson catches the apple that Snow White ate from the other side of the portal and gives it to Regina, who gets Emma to eat it by baking the apple into a turnover. Henry tries to convince his mother not to eat it and takes a bite of the turnover himself, falling into the same sleeping curse as Snow White.

Production
"An Apple Red as Blood" was co-written by co-executive producer David H. Goodman and consulting producer Jane Espenson, while 24 veteran, Milan Cheylov, directed the hour. The episode was included in Reawakened: A Once Upon a Time Tale – a novelization of the first season – which was published by Hyperion Books in 2013.

Reception

Ratings
The episode held steady from the previous outing to a 3.0/8 among 18-49s with 8.95 million viewers tuning in, once again winning its timeslot for the fourth week in a row, although The Amazing Race had more viewers that same hour.

In Canada, the episode finished in fourteenth place with an estimated 1.601 million viewers, an increase from the 1.407 million of the previous episode.

Reviews
In a review from Entertainment Weekly, writer Hilary Busis noted that this installment didn't have as much substance as the previous episodes, but was good enough to fill in the holes and compared the Enchanted Forest rescue scene to that of The Avengers.

References

External links

 

2012 American television episodes
Once Upon a Time (season 1) episodes
Television episodes written by Jane Espenson
Television episodes set in Maine